Donald Forsha Jones (April 16, 1890 – June 19, 1963) was a United States maize geneticist and practical corn breeder at the Connecticut Agricultural Experiment Station, New Haven. Beginning at the station in 1914, he made high-yielding hybrid corn practical by his invention of the double-cross hybrid.

In Jones' method, four inbred corn lines are used. The seed from two initial crosses are used to grow up parental hybrids for the production fields. The production fields yield seed in sufficient quantity to make the scheme practical. Until Jones invented the double-cross method, the yield from the parent lines (the inbreds) was insufficient to allow practical production of hybrid corn seed.

Jones’ work received significant public attention and was used to make the first commercial hybrid corn in the 1920s. He was the sole geneticist at the Connecticut Station from 1915 until 1921, when Paul Mangelsdorf became his assistant there.  Jones was the president of the Genetics Society of America in 1935.  He was elected to the American Academy of Arts and Sciences in 1934, and to the National Academy of Sciences in 1939.

Publications

References

External links
National Academy of Sciences Biographical Memoir

American botanists
American geneticists
1890 births
1963 deaths
Members of the United States National Academy of Sciences
Genetics (journal) editors